Utopia is a Canadian unincorporated community in Charlotte County, New Brunswick.

History

Camp Utopia

Utopia was home to Camp Utopia, the Canadian Army A-30 Canadian Infantry Training Centre from 1943 to 1958. Units lodged here:
 The Carleton and York Regiment and The North Shore (New Brunswick) Regiment - 1943 to 1954.
 8th Canadian Hussars (Princess Louise's) - 1954-1955

The base was replaced by a new and large base located in Gagetown in 1958. The structures at the base were demolished and left vacant since.

Notable people

See also
List of communities in New Brunswick

References

Communities in Charlotte County, New Brunswick